The C-SPAN Bus Program is an umbrella term for the activity surrounding several vehicles that have been used by C-SPAN since 1993, starting with the C-SPAN School Bus. The inspiration for the bus program was at least partly taken from Douglas Brinkley's book The Majic Bus: An American Odyssey, which described Prof. Brinkley's experiences taking groups of college students on tours of historic sites around the U.S. The first C-SPAN school bus began its service in 1993, and a second bus was introduced in 1996. In 2010, the C-SPAN Digital Bus and the first Local Content Vehicle debuted, and the original two buses were retired.

C-SPAN School Buses
The original two buses served as mobile television studios, with technical facilities and an interview area that could be used for production of live or taped content. Between them, the two original C-SPAN School Buses visited all fifty U.S. states, and over 2,000 communities. They were used for many of the remote programs produced by C-SPAN, including their programs on the Lincoln–Douglas Debates, the American tour of Alexis de Tocqueville, the American Presidents series, the American Writers series, and many more.

In January 1995, C-SPAN was awarded the Golden CableACE Award for programming and educational efforts related to the C-SPAN School Bus.

The C-SPAN bus has hosted over 1.5 million visitors, which includes 40,000 teachers and 800,000 students.

C-SPAN Digital Bus

The C-SPAN digital bus was introduced in June 2010. It is a 45-foot Prevost coach, and was custom-built by Creative Mobile Interiors of Grove City, Ohio.

Local Content Vehicles
In 2010, in addition to the Digital Bus, C-SPAN introduced a Local Content Vehicle ("LCV"), a Ford Transit Connect specially outfitted for use in producing content from locations around the country. This program was later expanded to include a total of three vehicles. Each of the three vehicles is staffed by one person, and is equipped with a video camera and a laptop editor.

In 2011, C-SPAN introduced the Local Content Vehicles Cities Tour, in which all three of the LCVs would spend a week in a particular city, gathering content to be aired shortly thereafter over the course of a weekend. Typically, one vehicle would focus on history and historic sites in a particular city; another would focus on aspects of that city related to books; and the third would focus on community relations, in co-operation with the local cable provider. Between May and December 2011, the LCVs visited eight U.S. cities following this pattern. The practice was renewed in 2012, with visits to six other cities scheduled between January and June. Typically, the footage and interviews from a particular city visit would air three to four weeks after the visit took place.

In 2013, C-SPAN expanded their LCV fleet from three vehicles to six, allowing the network to double the number of cities it visits each month.

Cities visited on LCV tours

References

External links

Departure of the first C-SPAN Bus from Washington, November 8, 1993
C-SPAN School Bus Special, July 11, 1994 - 2 hour 30 minute retrospective on the first seven months of the first C-SPAN School Bus.
Booknotes interview with Douglas Brinkley on The Majic Bus: An American Odyssey, April 18, 1993.
C-SPAN Bus FAQs
Creative Mobile Interiors page on the Digital Bus
Creative Mobile Interiors page on the LCVs
MSNBC tour of Digital Bus with Chuck Todd, Savannah Guthrie, and Brian Lamb

C-SPAN
Individual buses
Projects established in 1993
Golden CableACE award winners